The 1945 Duke Blue Devils football team represented the Duke Blue Devils of Duke University during the 1945 college football season.

Duke won the 1945 Southern Conference Championship, and finished the season ranked 13th in the final AP poll.

Schedule

References

Duke
Duke Blue Devils football seasons
Southern Conference football champion seasons
Duke Blue Devils football